The DDG(X) program, also known as the Next-Generation Guided-Missile Destroyer program, is a United States Navy program to develop a class of surface combatant vessels to succeed its 22 Flight II s and 27 Flight I/II s. The ships will become the principal large surface combatants of the U.S. Navy; compared to their predecessors, they will incorporate more powerful sensors and have more room and weight margin for growth.

History
With the cancellation of the CG(X) in 2010, the U.S. Navy embarked on new studies and programs for the future of the air defense role fulfilled by the Ticonderoga-class cruisers. Because the cruisers were built on the  hulls, they had limited upgrade potential due to space, weight, and power margins. Meanwhile, the procurement of the Zumwalt-class destroyers was severely curtailed due to high costs and a renewed emphasis on air and missile defense for larger combatants. Eventually, the Navy chose to upgrade the Ticonderogas and procure the Flight III Arleigh Burke-class destroyers with the enhanced AN/SPY-6 and improved combat systems to supplement the Ticonderogas for air and missile defense. 

The Navy also launched studies into a Future Surface Combatant (FSC) to replace the Ticonderoga-class—which will reach the end of their service lives in the 2020s—as well as older flights of the Arleigh Burke class. The FSC evolved into the Large Surface Combatant (LSC) program, which became the DDG(X), with the program office established in June 2021. In February 2022, Gibbs & Cox was contracted to provide design and engineering support. The Navy is retaining the lead design role.

Design

Hull
Various hull configurations are currently being tested at Naval Surface Warfare Center (NSWC) Carderock and NSWC Philadelphia. Future vessels of the class may be lengthened with a payload module for additional capabilities.

The DDG(X) hull design will incorporate lessons and elements from both the Arleigh Burke and Zumwalt designs. The vessels will be able to accommodate larger missile launch systems, improved survivability, and space, weight, power, and cooling margins for future growth. As the ships will replace the Ticonderoga-class cruisers, they will have air defense command and control facilities and accommodations for an admiral's staff.

Parts of the design concept of the DDG(X) have also been noted as externally similar to the Type 055 destroyer by some defense analysts, with two classes of ship sharing similar stealth profiles, propulsion configurations, and vertical launch system placements.

Propulsion
The DDG(X) will use Integrated Power System (IPS), a modern integrated turboelectric drive as employed on the Zumwalt class. The vessels are expected to have 50% greater range, a 120% greater time on station, and a 25% reduction in fuel burn compared to current U.S. Navy destroyers.

Sensors
The sensors will initially be enlarged variants of the AN/SPY-6 radar mounted on the Flight III Arleigh Burke-class destroyers. The hull is designed with provisions for upgraded sensors in the future, including larger radar arrays.

Weapons
The vessels will be initially fitted with 32-cell blocks of the Mark 41 VLS, with the concept image of the hull showing four such blocks. Instead of the Mk 41 block, a 12-cell block of larger launchers for hypersonic missiles can also be accepted. The concept image also shows the vessel mounting a main 5-inch (127-mm)/62 cal Mark 45 Mod 4 gun. Upgraded versions of the class may also incorporate directed energy weapons, with lasers ranging from 150 to 600 kW.

See also
 Cruiser Baseline
 CG(X)
 
 Type 055 destroyer, similar in hull design

References

External links
 DDG(X) NAVSEA page

Destroyer classes
Destroyers of the United States Navy
Proposed ships of the United States Navy